Ree, Rée or REE may refer to:

People
 Arikara or Ree, a Native American tribe

Persons
 Sir Frank Ree (1851–1914), British railway manager
 Hans Ree (born 1944), Dutch chess grandmaster and writer
 Paul Rée, philosopher
 Rimhak Ree (1922–2005), Korean Canadian mathematician
 Ree Drummond (born 1969), American food blogger and television personality

Fictional characters
 Killashandra Ree, a fictional character in Crystal Singer by Anne McCaffrey

Places
 Lough Ree, an Irish lake
 Ree, County Londonderry, a townland in County Londonderry, Northern Ireland

Biology
 Ree or reeve, a female ruff (bird)
 Reduced enamel epithelium, sometimes called reduced dental epithelium, overlies a developing tooth
 Resting energy expenditure, the amount of calories required for a 24-hour period by the body during resting conditions

Other
 Radio Exterior de España, the Spanish government's international broadcaster
 Red Eléctrica de España, the Spanish transmission system operator

 Rare-earth element, a group of chemical elements
 Rashba-Edelstein effect 2D spin-charge interconversion effect

 Re'eh (ראה in Hebrew), the 47th weekly parshah or portion in the annual Jewish cycle of Torah reading and the fourth in the book of Deuteronomy
 Resident Evil: Extinction, a 2007 film
 Resource and Energy Economics, a journal on energy economics and environmental economics
 Ruby (programming language) Enterprise Edition
 Rees's Cyclopædia, a nineteenth-century encyclopedia, particularly rich in coverage of science and technology
 Ree, a phrase commonly associated with Pepe the Frog, a comic book character and Internet meme

See also

 O'Ree (surname)
 
 Rees (disambiguation)
 Rhee (disambiguation)
 Re (disambiguation)